The 2014 Kerry Senior Football Championship was the 114th staging of the Kerry Senior Football Championship since its establishment by the Kerry County Board in 1889. The championship ran from 24 May to 2 November 2014.

Dr. Crokes entered the championship as the defending champions in search of a record-equalling fifth successive title, however, they were beaten by Killarney Legion in round 3.

The final was played on 2 November 2014 at FitzGerald Stadium in Killarney, between Austin Stacks and Mid Kerry in what was their second ever meeting in the final. Austin Stacks won the match by 2-13 to 1-07 to claim their 12th championship title overall and a first title in 20 years.

Mid Kerry's Gavin O'Grady was the championship's top scorer with 5-28.

Team changes

To Championship

Promoted from the Kerry Intermediate Football Championship
 Currow

From Championship

Relegated to the Kerry Intermediate Football Championship
 Finuge

Results

Round 1

Round 2

Relegation playoffs

Round 3

 West Kerry received a bye in this round.

Quarter-finals

Semi-finals

Final

Championship statistics

Top scorers

Overall

In a single game

Miscellaneous

 Currow made their first appearance at senior level.
 Dr. Crokes suffered a first championship loss since 2009.
 The final went to a replay for the first time since 2008.
 Austin Stacks won the title for the first time since 1994.

References

Kerry Senior Football Championship
Kerry Senior Football Championship